The Armenian Kingdom of Cilicia mirrored the Latin Kingdom of Jerusalem in it selection of great offices: constable, marshal, seneschal, admiral, Chamberlain, butler, chancellor and at certain times also bailiff.

The Officers of the Armenian Kingdom of Cilicia are as follows:

Constable
Sempad the Constable
John of Poitiers-Lusignan

Marshal
Stephen of Armenia

Seneschal

Admiral

Chamberlain

Butler

Chancellor

Bailiff

References
La Monte, John L. Feudal Monarchy in the Latin Kingdom of Jerusalem 1100 to 1291. Medieval Academy of America, 1932.

Armenian Kingdom of Cilicia